Colton may refer to:

Places

Australia 
 Colton, South Australia, a locality in the District Council of Elliston
 Electoral district of Colton, South Australia

England 
 Colton, Cumbria
 Colton, Leeds (a village to the east of the city.)
 Colton, Norfolk (in Marlingford and Colton parish)
 Colton, North Yorkshire
 Colton, Staffordshire
 Colton, Suffolk (in Great Barton parish)

United States 
 Colton, California
 Colton, Nebraska
 Colton, New York
 Colton (CDP), New York
 Colton, Ohio
 Colton, Oregon
 Colton, South Dakota
 Colton, Utah, a ghost town
 Colton, Washington
 Colton Crater, Coconino County, Arizona
 Colton Hall California's Constitution Hall in Monterey

People with the name 
 Colton (given name)
 Colton (surname)

Other uses
 Colton antigen system
 Marr and Colton, a pipe organ company